Mondiana  Diamond J'hanne Pierre (Born August 23, 1997, in Port-au-Prince) is a Haitian beauty queen who was crowned as Miss Haiti in 2013 and competed at Miss Universe in Russia but Unplaced.

Miss Haiti 2013
Pierre Mondiana J’hanne was crowned Miss Universe Haiti 2013 and represented the country in the Miss Universe 2013 pageant on 9 November 2013 in Moscow, Russia but failed to place in the semifinals.

References

External links
 Miss Haiti Universe official fan page

1996 births
Living people
Haitian female models
Haitian beauty pageant winners
Miss Universe 2013 contestants